The Roman Catholic Diocese of El Obeid is a diocese in El-Obeid in the Ecclesiastical province of Khartoum in Sudan.

History
 May 10, 1960: Established as Apostolic Vicariate of El Obeid from Apostolic Vicariate of Khartoum
 December 12, 1974: Promoted as Diocese of El Obeid

Special churches
The Cathedral is Our Lady Queen of Africa Cathedral in El-Obeid.

Bishops
 Vicar Apostolic of El Obeid (Roman rite)
 Bishop Edoardo Mason, M.C.C.I. (1960.05.10 – 1969)
 Bishops of El Obeid (Roman rite)
 Bishop Paulino Lukudu Loro, M.C.C.I. (1979.03.05 – 1983.02.19), appointed Archbishop of Juba
 Bishop Macram Max Gassis, M.C.C.I. (1988.03.12 – 2013.10.28)
 Bishop Michael Didi Adgum Mangoria (2013.10.28 - 2015.08.15); appointed by Pope Francis to be Coadjutor Archbishop to Cardinal Gabriel Zubeir Wako, of the Roman Catholic Archdiocese of Khartoum, in Khartoum, Sudan; was to serve as El Obeid's Apostolic Administrator during the sede vacante (vacant see period) until a new Bishop was selected
 Bishop Yunan Tombe Trille Kuku Andali (2017.02.18 - present)
 Another apostolic administrator was Bishop Antonio Menegazzo, M.C.C.I.  (1996-2010)

Coadjutor Bishop
Michael Didi Adgum Mangoria (2010-2013)

See also
Saint Josephine Bakhita
Roman Catholicism in Sudan

References

Sources
 Diocese of El Obeid. GCatholic
 Cathedral of Our Lady Queen of Africa
 Diocese of El Obeid website

External links
 Bishop Macram Gassis Website

El Obeid
Christian organizations established in 1960
Roman Catholic dioceses and prelatures established in the 20th century
1960 establishments in Sudan
El-Obeid
Roman Catholic bishops of El Obeid